Deon T. Tedder is an American attorney and politician. He is a member of the South Carolina House of Representatives from the 109th District, serving since 2020. He is a member of the Democratic party. He serves on the Education and Public Works Committee and the Operations and Management Committee  and is Treasurer of the South Carolina Legislative Black Caucus.

Tedder has had a bill passed supporting HBCUs, and supported clean energy and electric vehicle technology. He opposed a bail reform bill, which he said would create 'a violation of due process'.

Tedder joined House members Todd Rutherford and Roger Kirby in forming the Freedom Caucus of South Carolina, in contrast to the conservative SC Freedom Caucus.

On March 12, 2023, Tedder announced his intention to run for the South Carolina Senate District 42 seat, to be vacated by Marlon Kimpson after his appointment to a role in the Biden Administration. The seat will be decided in a special election in 2023.

References

1990 births
Living people
Democratic Party members of the South Carolina House of Representatives
21st-century American politicians
African-American people in South Carolina politics
South Carolina State University alumni
University of South Carolina School of Law alumni
Politicians from Durham, North Carolina
21st-century African-American politicians